OIT may refer to:

Science and technology

Computing
 Operator Interface Terminal, in industrial design (see user interface)
 Order-independent transparency, in computer graphics

Medicine
 Oral immunotherapy, oral feeding of allergen to raise allergic threshold

Other uses in science and technology
 Out of India Theory, the idea that the Aryans are indigenous to the Indian subcontinent
 Oxidative-induction time, a standardized test which measures the level of thermal stabilization

Places
 Oita Airport, Kunisaki, Oita Prefecture, Japan (by IATA airport code)

Education
 Osaka Institute of Technology, Osaka, Japan
 Oregon Institute of Technology, Oregon, United States
 Oriental Institute of Technology, a university in New Taipei, Taiwan